Junga is a 2018 Indian Tamil-language action comedy film written and directed by Gokul. The film stars Vijay Sethupathi as triple role single lead role and double cameo roles alongside Sayyeshaa and Madonna Sebastian. It was released to mixed reviews from critics, praising Vijay Sethupathi's performance and Yogi Babu’s comedy performance. The music was composed by Siddharth Vipin. The film was shot in Paris.

Plot 
The film starts with Inspector Manimaran taking the job of Don Junga's encounter, along with Duraisingam (Rajendran). On the way to his encounter, Junga tells his story.

Back in Pollachi, he works as a bus conductor and is in love with Thoppul. He gets involved in a fight, which angers his mother, as his father Ranga and grandfather Linga were dons with very expensive habits. They also lost their theater Cinema Paradise and had to sell it to Kumarasamy Chettiyaar, so his mother fears that he will follow their spending habits. Junga tells his mother that he will not be a don like Ranga and Linga and will retrieve their ownership of the theater. He goes to Chennai with Yo Yo, becomes a miserly don, and starts saving money towards his goal. He also leaves Thoppul as she wants him to give her a luxurious life and gift her with 365 saris for each day of the year. 

One day, Junga learns that the theater is being brought down and that Chettiyaar is planning to sell it to a foreign company. He goes to Chettiyaar's house and gives him a crore to buy back his theater, but Chettiyaar insults him. Junga challenges Chettiyaar that he will retrieve back his theater. He decides to kidnap Chettiyaar's daughter Yazhini, who is in Paris, so he goes there with Yo Yo, but the Italian mafia group kidnaps Yazhini to release their leader, who was arrested by the French police. Junga tells Chettiyaar that he has kidnapped Yazhini and fights with the mafia group to rescue her from them. Yazhini and Junga escape, and Chettiyaar agrees to give Junga's family the theater in exchange for Yazhini. Yazhini and Junga later get married. However, Junga's friends ask for a success party, for which he gives them porridge. His friends are furious with the miser and therefore give information about Junga's whereabouts to the police. Manimaran tries to shoot the miser, but a lorry suddenly appeared, causing an accident and leading to Junga escaping.

Cast 

Vijay Sethupathi as Don Junga, Don Ranga (Junga's father), and Don Linga (Junga's grandfather)
Sayyeshaa as Yazhini
Madonna Sebastian as Thoppul
Suresh Chandra Menon as Kumarasamy Chettiyaar, Yazhini's father
Yogi Babu as Yo Yo, Junga's assistant
Rajendran as Duraisingam
Saranya Ponvannan as Junga's mother, Ranga's wife, and Linga's daughter-in-law
Radha Ravi as Sopraj
Delhi Ganesh as Sukumar
Vijaya Patti as Junga's grandmother, Ranga's mother, and Linga's wife
Vinoth Munna as Inspector G. Manimaran
Bala Jaganathan as Poetu Dinesh
Syed as Senthil
Shelfa as Ali
Anne Brugé as Kalki
Louna as French TV journalist
Chaplin Balu
Gokul in a special appearance
Sridhar in a special appearance in the song "Amma Mela Sathiyam"
Jhony in a special appearance in the song "Amma Mela Sathiyam"
Boopathy in a special appearance in the song "Rise of Don"
Emcee Jesz in a special appearance in the song "Rise of Don"

Soundtrack 

The soundtrack album was composed by Siddharth Vipin. The complete album was released on 30 July 2018 at Sathyam Cinemas. The album consists of six tracks.

Release 
Tamil Nadu theatrical rights were sold for 12 crore. The film was also dubbed in Hindi as Junga – The Real Don and released on YouTube by Wide Angle Media Pvt. Ltd. on 10 March 2019. The satellite rights of the film were bagged by Zee Tamil

References 

2010s Tamil-language films
2018 action comedy films
2018 films
Films about organised crime in India
Films scored by Siddharth Vipin
Indian action comedy films
Indian gangster films
Indian nonlinear narrative films
Mafia comedy films